Japygellus is a genus of diplurans in the family Japygidae.

Species
 Japygellus serrifer Silvestri, 1930

References

Diplura